Gordon Frederick Goldsberry (August 30, 1927 – February 23, 1996) was an American professional baseball player, scout and front-office executive.

Born in Sacramento, California, Goldsberry attended the University of California at Los Angeles. His professional playing career lasted 13 seasons (1944–56), and included all or part of seven years spent in the top-level Pacific Coast League for the Hollywood Stars, Los Angeles Angels, Oakland Oaks and Seattle Rainiers.

After retiring from the field, Goldsberry became a scout for the Los Angeles Dodgers, Chicago Cubs, Milwaukee Brewers (where he signed future Hall of Famer Robin Yount), and Philadelphia Phillies. When Phillies' manager and former farm system director Dallas Green became general manager of the Cubs following the  season, he brought Goldsberry with him as the Cubs' director of player development and scouting. In 1989, Goldsberry joined the Baltimore Orioles as special assistant to the general manager, Roland Hemond. He served in that role until his February 1996 death from an apparent heart attack in Laguna Hills, California, at the age of 68.

References

External links

1927 births
1996 deaths
Albuquerque Dukes players
Baltimore Orioles executives
Baseball players from Sacramento, California
Charleston Senators players
Chicago Cubs executives
Chicago Cubs scouts
Chicago White Sox players
Hollywood Stars players
Little Rock Travelers players
Lockport White Sox players
Los Angeles Angels (minor league) players
Los Angeles Dodgers scouts
Major League Baseball farm directors
Major League Baseball first basemen
Major League Baseball scouting directors
Memphis Chickasaws players
Milwaukee Brewers scouts
Oakland Oaks (baseball) players
Philadelphia Phillies scouts
St. Louis Browns players
Seattle Rainiers players
Tulsa Oilers (baseball) players
Yakima Stars players